Daft Planet is a Canadian cartoon, first airing on Teletoon. The first episode ran on September 2, 2002 and the show continued to run for almost two years even though only 13 episodes were produced. Its main claim to fame is that it was the first cartoon in the world that was animated entirely in Flash and appeared on a national television network. The show met with some success but was taken off the air when funding ran out due to cuts to the CTF program. The show was born from a 10-minute pilot written and animated by Brent Donnelly and Derry Smith and produced by Valis Video (Toronto). The pilot can be viewed on YouTube along with some aired episodes of Daft Planet.

Plot
The plot, set in the fictional Maple City, encircles the day-to-day lives of the protagonists, Ched and Hudson, in their on-going struggle to keep up with the latest trends and maintain their positions in the social hierarchy in high school. With Ched living from a trailer park, as the son of a taxidermist and Hudson as the son of a wealthy network executive, a parallel is drawn between the two characters, offering unlikely chemistry. No one in the show has necks, and their heads just float over their bodies, but this is never mentioned and they have no apparent difficulty doing things that would require necks, like eating or breathing.

Episodes

References

External links 
 

2002 Canadian television series debuts
2002 Canadian television series endings
2000s Canadian adult animated television series
2000s Canadian animated comedy television series
2000s Canadian high school television series
Canadian adult animated comedy television series
Canadian flash animated television series
English-language television shows
Teletoon original programming
Teen animated television series